Woolery is a surname. Notable people with the surname include:

Chuck Woolery (born 1941), American game show host, talk show host, and musician
Kaiyne Woolery (born 1995), British footballer
Laurie Woolery, American playwright, director, and educator

English-language surnames